William Dixon (October 27, 1808October 9, 1887) was an English American immigrant, farmer, and Republican politician.  He served two terms in the Wisconsin State Assembly, representing Richland County.

Biography
Dixon was born on October 27, 1808, in Beverley, England. He married Philia Carswell in 1830. He immigrated to Oneida County, New York, in 1834. He later owned a farm in Exeter, New York, before renting one in Buena Vista, Richland County, Wisconsin, and eventually owning another in Ithaca, Wisconsin, in 1855. He died on October 9, 1887, and was buried in Bear Valley Cemetery in Bear Valley, Wisconsin.

Political career
Dixon was a member of the Assembly during the 1859 and 1872 sessions. Other positions he held include Chairman of the Town Board (similar to city council) of Ithaca. He was a Republican.

References

External links 
  at Find a Grave

1808 births
1887 deaths
People from Beverley
English emigrants to the United States
19th-century English people
People from Otsego County, New York
People from Richland County, Wisconsin
Republican Party members of the Wisconsin State Assembly
Mayors of places in Wisconsin
Wisconsin city council members
Farmers from New York (state)
Farmers from Wisconsin